Patrimonio is a commune in France. Patrimonio also means 'estate', 'property', 'wealth' or 'heritage' in Latin languages and may refer to
Patrimonio (surname)
Patrimonio histórico español, a term for Spain's heritage
Patrimonio Nacional, a Spanish state agency
Patrimonio AOC, a brand of Corsica wine